European Education: A Journal of Issues and Studies is a quarterly academic journal covering European education that was established in 1969 and is published by Taylor and Francis. The journal covers education policy, theory, and practice with least one thematic issue per year. The editors-in-chief are Iveta Silova (Lehigh University) and Noah W. Sobe (Loyola University Chicago).

Abstracting and indexing 
European Education is abstracted and indexed in SCOPUS, British Education Index, Education Resources Information Center, Educational Research Abstracts Online, International Bibliography of Periodical Literature, Sociology of Education Abstracts, and Wilson Education Index.

References

External links
 
 Journal page at publisher's site

Education journals
Quarterly journals
Publications established in 1969
English-language journals
M. E. Sharpe academic journals